Meo or Meos may refer to:

 MenuetOS, or MeOS, an operating system
Microsomal ethanol oxidizing system, an alternate ethanol metabolic pathway
 mEos, a variant of the photoactivatable fluorescent protein Eos
 Mati Meos (born 1946), Estonian engineer and politician

See also
Meo (disambiguation)